Freopsis leucostictica is a species of beetle in the family Cerambycidae, and the only species in the genus Freopsis. It was described by White in 1858.

References

Crossotini
Beetles described in 1858
Monotypic Cerambycidae genera